Jessie Ann Scott (1883–1959) was a New Zealand medical doctor, medical officer and prisoner of war.

Early life 
Jessie Scott was born in Brookside, North Canterbury, New Zealand, in 1883 and attended Christchurch Girls' High School. She studied medicine at the University of Edinburgh, graduating MB ChB in 1909 and MD in 1912.

Career 
Scott remained in Edinburgh after her training and worked as the resident medical officer at the Edinburgh Hospital for Women and Children. During this time, she was a guest speaker, along with Dr Elsie Inglis, Chrystal MacMillan and Alice Low, at an NUWSS meeting in Edinburgh's Café Oak Hall.

She then became assistant medical officer to the London County Council for three years from 1910 to 1913. During this time she completed her MD thesis in public health. She returned to New Zealand in 1913 and practiced in Auckland.

In World War I she returned to the United Kingdom and volunteered for the Scottish Women's Hospitals for Foreign Service a unit staffed by women. She served in Serbia, where she was captured by the Austrians and kept a prisoner of war for four months, and later became a medical officer with the Serbian Army. Later in the war she worked with the Royal Army Medical Corps in Salonika and France. For her service in Serbia she was awarded the Order of St Sava 4th class by the Serbian government.

After the war, Scott returned to London in 1920 where she did postgraduate work in gynaecology and paediatrics at the Chelsea Hospital for Women and the Victoria Hospital for Children, and worked for the London County Council as a medical officer.

In 1924 she returned to Christchurch where she worked as an obstetrician and gynaecologist in the public hospital. After being frustrated by obstructions from male colleagues she went into private practice.

Scott served on many organisations including the National Council of Women, the Federation of University Women, and the Women's War Service Auxiliary during World War Two. She became one of two vice-presidents of the Christchurch Branch of the New Zealand Medical Women's Association in 1954. She gave the first medical presentation to the branch on her experiences during World War One in the Scottish Medical Women's Hospital in Serbia.

Jessie Scott died in August 1959 in Christchurch.

See also
 Edith McKay
 Agnes Bennett
 Mabel Atkinson
 Olive Kelso King
 Mary de Garis

References

External links 
Jessie Anne Scott. Auckland Museum Online Cenotaph

Great War Stories 4: Dr Jessie Scott. (2017) NZ OnScreen

New Zealand Military Nursing. Serbian Awards to New Zealand medical women. New Zealand Army Nursing Service - Royal New Zealand Nursing Corps.

WWI: The NZ Female Doctor who became a POW. Video on Newsroom, 25 April 2022

1883 births
1959 deaths
New Zealand women medical doctors
New Zealand prisoners of war in World War I
New Zealand military personnel of World War I
People from North Canterbury
New Zealand military doctors
Alumni of the University of Edinburgh Medical School
World War I prisoners of war held by Austria-Hungary
20th-century New Zealand medical doctors
20th-century women physicians
People educated at Christchurch Girls' High School